16BO133 is a SARS-like coronavirus (SL-COV) which was found in the greater horseshoe bat in South Korea.  It was published in 2019 and its genome was completely sequenced. The sequenced Korean SARSr-CoV strain belongs to the severe acute respiratory syndrome coronavirus 1, and its genome sequence similarity is 82.8%.

Discovery 
The 16BO133 virus was discovered in the oral cavity of the greater horseshoe bat in 2016. The genome of this virus strain is 29075 nt. Among SARSr-CoVs, 16BO133 is the closest to the JTMC15 virus, which was published in 2016 and discovered in Jilin, China, with a genome nucleic acid sequence similarity of 98.3%. Compared with other SARSr-CoVs, these two viruses have the ORF8 strain due to a frameshift mutation at the end of ORF7b. The similarity of the genome nucleic acid sequence of 16BO133 virus and SARS-CoV is 82.8%.

Although other SARSr-CoV strains have been found in Korea in the past (B15-21 virus, etc.), none of them have been sequenced. The 16BO133 virus is the first Korean SARSr-CoV strain to be completely sequenced.

Phylogenetic

See also 
 Bat coronavirus RaTG13

References

References 
 

Bat virome
SARS-related coronavirus
Infraspecific virus taxa